Jāņi is an annual Latvian festival celebrating the summer solstice. Although astronomically the solstice falls on 21 or 22 June, the public holidays—Līgo Day and Jāņi Day—are on 23 and 24 June. The day before Jāņi is known as Līgosvētki, Līgovakars or simply Līgo.

On Jāņi, people travel from the city into the countryside to gather and eat, drink, sing and celebrate the solstice by observing the ancient folk traditions relating to renewal and fertility. 

It is celebrated both in Latvia and in many areas where the Latvian diaspora lives such as the United States, Canada, Argentina, and Australia.

Title
The name "Līgosvētki" was first used and introduced in 1900 in his Jāņi songs collection by Emilis Melngailis, who back in 1928 wrote in the newspaper "Jaunākās Ziņas":

Traditions

Use of plants
Plant material, collected and used for decorative, therapeutic and other symbolic purposes, is important in the celebration of Jāņi. Most herbaceous plants are used, but people typically collect bedstraw, cow wheat, vetchling and clover. 

Plant material is used to decorate rooms, courtyards, yards, and woven into wreaths. Specific tree species are used as sources of material for decoration. Birch boughs and oak branches are commonly used, however aspen and alder are not as they are considered evil. Some herbs were collected at noon, others on Jāņi Eve, or on Jāņi morning when covered in dew. In 1627, P. Einhorn wrote:

During Jāņi, foliage of rowan, oak, linden and birch trees is collected and hung to decorate homes, barns and granaries, as well as tied to gates, doors and cars. Thorns, thistles and nettles are hung to repel evil spirits and witches. In past times, herbaceous plants were dried and fed to cows shortly after calving during winter and spring. On Zāļu Day, herbs were used to make a tea which was given to sick people and livestock. On Jāņi Day, rowan twigs were tied together, dried and used for child's fumigation, to treat sickness, anxiety, or where a child was afflicted by an evil eye.

Wreath making

Circular wreaths made of flowers, grasses and oak leaves are woven and worn on the head. Different types of plants are used to make wreaths for males and females. Women and girls wear wreaths made from flowers, grasses and herbs. It is believed that wreaths braided with twenty seven flowers and herbs prevents disasters and diseases, and repels enemies. Men and boys wear wreaths made of oak leaves, symbolising the physical strength of the oak tree. Oak wreaths were also thought to promise the blessing of horses and bees. Together with Jāņi cheese and fires, wreaths are also symbols of the sun.

Fire
During Jāņi, fires (also known as pūdeļa, pundeļa, Jāņi candles, and witch burning) are lit and burned from sunset till next morning. This practice reflects the belief that light from the fires will transmit to the next solar year. It is believed that fires should be burned at a high point in the landscape, from which the light of the fire bestows power and fertility on the fields and people on which it shines. Leaping over the Jāņi fire is said to bring good luck and health through the coming year.

While fires are typically wood-fuelled, tar barrels or tarred wheels hoisted on poles are also burned.

Singing
Singing Līgo songs or Jāņi songs is associated with the promotion of fertility, acquisition of good fortune and prevention of calamity. Historically, the singing of Līgo songs began two weeks before Jāņi, reached its highest point on Jāņi Eve and lasted until Peter or Māras Day (15 August)—a period of around a month. After that, the singing of Līgo songs ceased until the next year. Singing Ligo songs on Jāņi night begins after dinner and continues throughout the night until the rising of the sun, either during jumping over Fire of Jāņi, or while going from houses to houses. Singing visits on Jāņi were called aplīgošana, servants visited their masters, maidens visited young men and vice versa.

On Jāņi Day people drink beer and eat cheese, believing that it will promote the growth of barley and production of cow milk in the next summer. Singing visitors from neighbouring houses are treated with cheese and beer.

Other traditions

Witches
There is a belief that on Jāņi morning, milk witches were running on dew and shouted: "Everything to me, everything to me!" If anyone heard it, they must respond with: "I butchered half of them!" Then there would be no shortage of milk. Witches are believed to have disguised themselves as normal women by dressing in white robes and letting their hair loose. Once disguised, it is believed that they would set spells or curses on the fields and livestock of their enemies.

Fern flowers
It was believed that whoever found a fern flower would gain wealth and happiness and learn the secrets of the past and future. "Whoever acquires the fern flower will be happy, because it can make anything they want to come true. The flower is hindered by evil spirits and only a brave person can get it". "On Jāņi Night, jump eight times around eight while on a broom handle, which is hoisted from a ground. During this time do not talk and do not laugh. Once you have done so, then hop on the broom shaft astride to the nearest fern patch, but only on your own, then you will see the blossoming of a fern flower".

History

John the Baptist Day celebration during the summer solstice time was known throughout the Christian world. Since 1584, Balthasar Russow wrote in his Chronicle of Livonia, that "All over the great land by Fire of Jāņi happened a great joyous dancing, singing and jumping". 

It is known, that at that time Riga's fishermen, mast selectors and ferries each year after solstice drove boats to Pārdaugava or to some islands in the Daugava, where, together with families and guests burned ruddy, rejoicing until the morning dawn.

When in 1759 Johann Steinhauer, a rich Latvian mast selector, bought part of Zasumuiža, it began a Herbal Eve celebration tradition. Later, the celebration was moved to Hermeliņa Manor, then on the right bank of the Daugava by the castle. Around 1790, a tradition to hold festive fireworks on Daugava was introduced. In 1820, the Riga's Council ordered to transfer Daugavmalas Herbal Market to Šāļu Gate at the end of Svērtuves Street. In 1832, a Latvian weekly newspaper "Tas Latviešu Ļaužu Draugs" gave the following description of the holiday:

After the establishment of Latvian Republic, the celebration of Zāļu diena turned into a popular holiday. It was proposed, that 22, 23 and 24 June should be recognized as national holidays, on 22 June celebrating Heroes Day (remembering the victory in Battle of Cēsis), Zāļu diena on 23 June and Jāņi Day on 24 June.

Similar festive celebration traditions worldwide

Celebration of the summer solstice is an ancient European tradition. It was especially observed in countries such as Denmark, Estonia, Latvia, Finland, Sweden, Russia, Ireland, France, Belarus, Norway, Italy, Portugal, Malta, United Kingdom, Spain, Poland, Ukraine.

It was also observed by European settlers in Canada (especially in Quebec) and the US.

References

Further reading
 Oswald Lideks (1940). Latvian holiday. Riga.
 Peter Schmidt (1940–1941). Latvian folk beliefs. Riga.
 Edith Olupe (1992). Latvian seasonal festivities. Riga.
 Latvian folk songs Vol. IV Riga, 1982.

External links
 Latvian folk songs about Jāņi celebration 
 Jāņi celebration descriptions „Latvian Dainas” 
 Latvian Jāņi songs 
 Jāņi symbols 
 Austris Grasis. Reflections on Jāņi 
 Latvian traditional seasonal rhythms 
 Traditional solstice rituals in Turaida  – 360° virtual tour | Virtual Latvia 

Observances in Latvia
Christianity in Latvia
Public holidays in Latvia
June observances
Summer events in Latvia
Summer holidays (Northern Hemisphere)